Andrew Foster (born 16 March 1972, in Stoke-on-Trent) is a former tennis player from Great Britain.

The right-hander reached the fourth round of Wimbledon in 1993, in only his second appearance at the All England Club. There, he posted his first ever Tour wins over Thomas Enqvist, Luis Herrera and Andrei Olhovskiy. His run ended in the round of 16 at the tournament, losing to the eventual winner, Pete Sampras.

Foster reached a career-high Association of Tennis Professionals (ATP) singles ranking of World No. 184 in January 1994. In doubles, Foster won four Challenger events, reaching as high as No. 174 in November 1993.

References

External links
 
 

1972 births
Living people
English male tennis players
Sportspeople from Stoke-on-Trent
British male tennis players
Tennis people from Staffordshire